The Captain 80 Book of BASIC Adventures is a book written by Robert Liddil and published in 1981.

Contents
The Captain 80 Book of BASIC Adventures is a book which lists game programs that a user can type up in BASIC.

Reception
Dick Mcgrath reviewed the book for Computer Gaming World, and stated that "Although the [...] price tag is a bit steep (considering the economy level quality of the printing and binding), the book is still a great value if you really intend to make use of all the program listings. The bad news, of course, is that it will take you about three months of steady typing to input the listings and another three months to debug your typographical errors."

Reviews
Computer and Video Games
Creative Computing
Your Computer

References

Books about video games